Celso Juarez Roth (born 30 November 1957) is a Brazilian football coach and former player who played as a central defender.

Coaching career 
On 4 May 2009, the former Grêmio coach joined Atlético Mineiro until the end of the season, he replaced Émerson Leão. On 12 June 2010. Roth was appointed as the coach of Internacional. About two-month after being appointed, he was rewarded with the 2010 Copa Libertadores title as Internacional beat Guadalajara in a two-leg final. On 8 April 2011, Roth was sacked with a decision from the board meeting. He had been criticized among fans since Internacional’s defeat to TP Mazembe in the Club World Cup semi-final match in December 2010.

Criticism 
Roth has often been the target of criticism by players, fans and media pundits. He was named the worst manager in Brazilian football in a poll contested by Série A and Série B players.

Roth was blamed by Souza to have costed Grêmio the 2008 Série A title, who called him stubborn, while Lopes claimed his tenure under Roth was humiliating. Former Vasco players Andrade and Fábio Braz also made negative remarks about Roth, calling him arrogant. Ilan, who played under Roth at Internacional, said the manager "destroys everywhere he goes".

Honors
Internacional
 Campeonato Gaúcho: 1997
 Copa Libertadores: 2010

Grêmio
 Campeonato Gaúcho: 1999
 Copa Sul: 1999

Sport Recife
 Copa do Nordeste: 2000

References

External links
 

1957 births
Living people
People from Caxias do Sul
Brazilian people of Italian descent
Sportspeople from Rio Grande do Sul
Brazilian footballers
Association football central defenders
Esporte Clube Juventude players
Brazilian football managers
Campeonato Brasileiro Série A managers
Kuwait Premier League managers
Esporte Clube Juventude managers
Qadsia SC managers
Al-Gharafa SC managers
Sport Club Internacional managers
Al Ahli Club (Dubai) managers
Grêmio Esportivo Brasil managers
Grêmio Esportivo Juventus managers
Sociedade Esportiva e Recreativa Caxias do Sul managers
Esporte Clube Vitória managers
Grêmio Foot-Ball Porto Alegrense managers
Sport Club do Recife managers
Sociedade Esportiva Palmeiras managers
Santos FC managers
Clube Atlético Mineiro managers
Goiás Esporte Clube managers
CR Flamengo managers
Botafogo de Futebol e Regatas managers
CR Vasco da Gama managers
Coritiba Foot Ball Club managers
Brazilian expatriate sportspeople in Qatar
Brazilian expatriate sportspeople in Kuwait
Expatriate football managers in Kuwait